Thomas Richter (born 27 February 1962) is a German football coach and former player.

References

1962 births
Living people
German footballers
German football managers
Holstein Kiel players
SSV Ulm 1846 players
Wuppertaler SV players
VfB Lübeck players
Kickers Emden managers
Viktoria Aschaffenburg players
2. Bundesliga players
Association football goalkeepers
3. Liga managers
People from Castrop-Rauxel
Sportspeople from Münster (region)
Footballers from North Rhine-Westphalia